Mohammad Sardar (born 22 September 1999) is an Afghan cricketer. He made his List A debut for Mis Ainak Region in the 2017 Ghazi Amanullah Khan Regional One Day Tournament on 10 August 2017. He made his Twenty20 debut for Kabul Eagles in the 2017 Shpageeza Cricket League on 18 September 2017. He made his first-class debut for Band-e-Amir Region in the 2017–18 Ahmad Shah Abdali 4-day Tournament on 20 October 2017.

References

External links
 

1999 births
Living people
Afghan cricketers
Band-e-Amir Dragons cricketers
Mis Ainak Knights cricketers
Cricketers from Kabul
Wicket-keepers